Khalili (also Romanized as Khalīlī) is a village in Sardshir Rural District, in the Central District of Buin va Miandasht County, Isfahan Province, Iran. At the 2006 census, its population was 222, in 72 families.

References 

Populated places in Buin va Miandasht County